Noureddine Dziri (born 19 December 1938) is a Tunisian boxer. He competed in the men's lightweight event at the 1960 Summer Olympics. At the 1960 Summer Olympics, he lost to Harry Lempio of Germany.

References

1938 births
Living people
Tunisian male boxers
Olympic boxers of Tunisia
Boxers at the 1960 Summer Olympics
Sportspeople from Tunis
Lightweight boxers